Reedsburg may refer to the following place in the United States:

 Reedsburg Dam, a dam in the state of Michigan
 Reedsburg, Ohio, historic unincorporated community in Ohio
 Reedsburg, Wisconsin, city in the state of Wisconsin
 Reedsburg Municipal Airport
 School District of Reedsburg
 Reedsburg Area High School
 Reedsburg (town), Wisconsin, adjacent to the city of Reedsburg